Henry or Harry Blackwell may refer to:

 Henry Browne Blackwell (1825–1909), American advocate for social and economic reform
 Henry Blackwell (cricketer) (1876–1900), English cricketer
 Harry Blackwell (1900–1956), English footballer

See also 
 Blackwell (surname)